Shabnam Hashmi (born 1957) is an Indian social activist and human rights campaigner born to Haneef and Qamar Azad Hashmi. . She is the sister of Safdar Hashmi and Sohail Hashmi. Safdar Hashmi was a communist playwright and director, best known for his work with street theatre in India.

She started her social activism campaigning about adult literacy in 1981. Since 1989 she has spent most of her time in combating communal and fundamentalist forces in India. After the Gujarat riots of 2002, Hashmi changed her focus to grass roots work and has spent a considerable amount of time in Gujarat. In 2003 she was one of the founders of ANHAD (Act Now for Harmony and Democracy), which she administers. it's FCRA license was cancelled based on inputs from intelligence agency for using foreign funding to work against the public interest  She also works in Kashmir, Bihar and Mewat area of Haryana.

She has campaigned against communalism and violation of human rights in the name of fighting terrorism. She was involved in exposing what she alleges are terror links of Hindutva forces but also fought for the rights of Batla house encounter suspect who later allegedly joined ISIS.

Shabnam Hashmi was amongst ninety-one women from India who figured in the list of 1,000 women who have been nominated globally for the Nobel Peace Prize-2005.

Hashmi has focused on issues of women's political participation, adoption, gender justice, democracy and secularism.

She was awarded the Association for Communal Harmony in Asia (ACHA) Star Award for Communal Harmony in 2005, Aamil Smriti Samman in 2005 and the National Minority Rights Award 2008 by the National Minority Commission.

References

Indian women activists
Indian women's rights activists
Indian human rights activists
Indian Muslims
Living people
1957 births